Bonda Mani is an Indian actor who has appeared in Tamil language films. He has worked in comedy and supporting roles in over 270 films.

Career 
Bonda Mani has described that his stage name is derived from his diet of bondas, when he was a struggling actor, and the suffix of his mentor, Goundamani. His original name is Kedheeswaran and he originates from Sri Lanka. While working in Singapore during the 1980s, he became acquainted with director K. Bhagyaraj who visited the country for a show. He later reconnected with Bhagyaraj during a visit to Chennai and was cast in a supporting role in Pavunnu Pavunuthan (1991). Mani subsequently made a breakthrough after his performance in Thendral Varum Theru (1994) won positive reviews. He appeared with legendary Tamil actor Vadivelu in many of his comedy tracks. Along with commitments as an actor, Bonda Mani runs a stage drama troupe called "Sai Kalai Koodam" and organizes theatrical shows.

Personal life 
In June 2016, Bonda Mani joined the All India Anna Dravida Munnetra Kazhagam political party along with a few Dravida Munnetra Kazhagam party workers. Bonda Mani personally met the Chief Minister Jayalalithaa to officially join the party.

Notable filmography

Television 

 Enga Veetu Meenakshi (2022) as Snake charmer

References

External links 

Bonda Mani on Moviebuff

1963 births
Indian male film actors
Male actors in Tamil cinema
Living people
21st-century Indian male actors
Indian male comedians
Tamil comedians
Sri Lankan emigrants to India
Indian people of Sri Lankan descent